Mahurahi is a village in Jagdishpur block of Bhojpur district in Bihar, India. As of 2011, its population was 2,072, in 311 households.

References 

Villages in Bhojpur district, India